Klemen Cehte (born 10 May 1986) is a Slovenian handball player who plays for Al Jazira Club.

His younger brother, Nejc Cehte, is also a professional handball player.

References

1986 births
Living people
People from Brežice
Slovenian male handball players
Expatriate handball players
Slovenian expatriate sportspeople in Qatar
Slovenian expatriate sportspeople in France
Slovenian expatriate sportspeople in the United Arab Emirates
Slovenian expatriate sportspeople in Hungary
Slovenian expatriate sportspeople in Austria